Kawachi Wisteria Garden (Japanese: 河内藤園 Kawachi fujien)  is a private garden located in  Kitakyushu founded by Higuchi Masao.
The garden contains over 20 kinds of wisterias in a 10,000m2 area.
CNN listed the garden among Japan's 31 most beautiful places, and this greatly increased its visitors; access is now limited to timed, advance-purchase tickets.

In popular culture
Kawachi Wisteria Garden is associated with the manga Kimetsu no Yaiba (Demon Slayer), and fans of the manga visit the garden.

References

External links

Japanese gardens
Kitakyushu